In mathematics, the Lasker–Noether theorem states that every Noetherian ring is a Lasker ring, which means that every ideal can be decomposed as an intersection, called primary decomposition, of finitely many primary ideals (which are related to, but not quite the same as, powers of prime ideals).

The Lasker–Noether theorem is an extension of the fundamental theorem of arithmetic, and more generally the fundamental theorem of finitely generated abelian groups to all Noetherian rings. The theorem plays an important role in algebraic geometry, by asserting that every algebraic set may be uniquely decomposed into a finite union of irreducible components.

It has a straightforward extension to modules stating that every submodule of a finitely generated module over a Noetherian ring is a finite intersection of primary submodules. This contains the case for rings as a special case, considering the ring as a module over itself, so that ideals are submodules. This also generalizes the primary decomposition form of the structure theorem for finitely generated modules over a principal ideal domain, and for the special case of polynomial rings over a field, it generalizes the decomposition of an algebraic set into a finite union of (irreducible) varieties.

The first algorithm for computing primary decompositions for polynomial rings over a field of characteristic 0 was published by Noether's student . The decomposition does not hold in general for non-commutative Noetherian rings. Noether gave an example of a non-commutative Noetherian ring with a right ideal that is not an intersection of primary ideals.

Primary decomposition of an ideal
Let  be a Noetherian commutative ring.

Then  has an irredundant primary decomposition into primary ideals:

.

Irredundancy means:

Removing any of the  changes the intersection, i.e. for each  we have: .
The prime ideals  are all distinct.

Moreover, this decomposition is unique in the two ways:
For the existence of the decomposition, see #Primary decomposition from associated primes below.

In the language of module theory, as discussed below, the set  is also the set of associated primes of the -module . Explicitly, that means that there exist elements  in  such that

The non-minimal elements, on the other hand, are called the embedded primes.

In the case of the ring of integers , the Lasker–Noether theorem is equivalent to the fundamental theorem of arithmetic.

Examples
The examples of the section are designed for illustrating some properties of primary decompositions, which may appear as surprising or counter-intuitive. All examples are ideals in a polynomial ring over a field .

Intersection vs. product

Because of the generator of degree one,  is not the product of two larger ideals. A similar example is given, in two indeterminates by

Primary vs. prime power
In , the ideal  is a primary ideal that has  as associated prime. It is not a power of its associated prime.

Non-uniqueness and embedded prime 

The associated primes are 

Example: Let N = R = k[x, y] for some field k, and let M be the ideal (xy, y2). Then M has two different minimal primary decompositions
M = (y) ∩ (x, y2) = (y) ∩ (x + y, y2).
The minimal prime is (y) and the embedded prime is (x, y).

Non-associated prime between two associated primes
In  the ideal  has the (non-unique) primary decomposition

A complicated example
Unless for very simple examples, a primary decomposition may be hard to compute and may have a very complicated output. The following example has been designed for providing such a complicated output, and, nevertheless, being accessible to hand-written computation.

Let

This condition implies that  has no primary component of height one. As  is generated by two elements, this implies that it is a complete intersection (more precisely, it defines an algebraic set, which is a complete intersection), and thus all primary components have height two.

In short, we have a primary component, with the very simple associated prime  such all its generating sets involve all indeterminates.

The other primary component contains .

Geometric interpretation 
In algebraic geometry, an affine algebraic set  is defined as the set of the common zeros of an ideal  of a polynomial ring 

An irredundant primary decomposition

of  defines a decomposition of  into a union of algebraic sets , which are irreducible, as not being the union of two smaller algebraic sets.

 
where the union is restricted to minimal associated primes.

The components of a primary decomposition (as well as of the algebraic set decomposition) corresponding to minimal primes are said isolated, and the others are said .

For the decomposition of algebraic varieties, only the minimal primes are interesting, but in intersection theory, and, more generally in scheme theory, the complete primary decomposition has a geometric meaning.

Primary decomposition from associated primes 
Nowadays, it is common to do primary decomposition of ideals and modules within the theory of associated primes. Bourbaki's influential textbook Algèbre commutative, in particular, takes this approach.

Let R be a ring and M a module over it. Equivalently, a prime ideal  is an associated prime of M if there is an injection of R-modules .

A maximal element of the set of annihilators of nonzero elements of M can be shown to be a prime ideal and thus, when R is a Noetherian ring, there exists an associated prime of M if and only if M is nonzero.

Directly from the definition,
If , then .
For an exact sequence , .
If R is a Noetherian ring, then  where  refers to support.

If M is a finitely generated module over R, then there is a finite ascending sequence of submodules
 
.
(In general, these inclusions are not the equalities.) In particular,  is a finite set when M is finitely generated.

A submodule N of M is called -primary if . A submodule of the R-module R is -primary as a submodule if and only if it is a -primary ideal; thus, when , the above decomposition is precisely a primary decomposition of an ideal.

Taking , the above decomposition says the set of associated primes of a finitely generated module M is the same as  when  (without finite generation, there can be infinitely many associated primes.)

Properties of associated primes 
Let  be a Noetherian ring. Then
The set of zero-divisors on R is the same as the union of the associated primes of R (this is because the set of zerodivisors of R is the union of the set of annihilators of nonzero elements, the maximal elements of which are associated primes).
 For the same reason, the union of the associated primes of an R-module M is exactly the set of zero-divisors on M, that is, an element r such that the endomorphism  is not injective.
Let  be a multiplicative subset,  an -module and  the set of all prime ideals of  not intersecting . Then  is a bijection. Also, .
 Any prime ideal minimal with respect to containing an ideal J is in  These primes are precisely the isolated primes.
 A module M over R has finite length if and only if M is finitely generated and  consists of maximal ideals.
Let  be a ring homomorphism between Noetherian rings and F a B-module that is flat over A. Then, for each A-module E,
.

Non-Noetherian case 
The next theorem gives necessary and sufficient conditions for a ring to have primary decompositions for its ideals.

The proof is given at Chapter 4 of Atiyah–MacDonald as a series of exercises.

There is the following uniqueness theorem for an ideal having a primary decomposition.

Now, for any commutative ring R,  an ideal I and a minimal prime P over I, the pre-image of I RP under the localization map is the smallest P-primary ideal containing I. Thus, in the setting of preceding theorem, the primary ideal Q corresponding to a minimal prime P is also the smallest P-primary ideal containing I and is called the P-primary component of I.

For example, if the power Pn of a prime P has a primary decomposition, then its P-primary component is the n-th symbolic power of P.

Additive theory of ideals

This result is the first in an area now known as the additive theory of ideals, which studies the ways of representing an ideal as the intersection of a special class of ideals. The decision on the "special class", e.g., primary ideals, is a problem in itself. In the case of non-commutative rings, the class of tertiary ideals is a useful substitute for the class of primary ideals.

Notes

References
M. Atiyah, I.G. Macdonald, Introduction to Commutative Algebra, Addison–Wesley, 1994. 
Bourbaki, Algèbre commutative.

 , esp. section 3.3.
. English translation in Communications in Computer Algebra 32/3 (1998): 8–30.

External links 

Commutative algebra
Theorems in ring theory
Algebraic geometry